The Tancarville Bridge  (Pont de Tancarville in French) is a suspension bridge that crosses the Seine River and connects Tancarville (Seine-Maritime) and Marais-Vernier (Eure), near Le Havre.

The bridge was completed in 1959 at a cost of 9 billion francs. In the 1990s it was realized that the cables had corroded and the shoulders were crumbling. Between 1996 and 1999, both the cables and shoulders were  replaced.

A brand of clothes horse introduced in 1960 was named  for its resemblance to the new bridge; in France, especially the northwest, the name has become a genericised trademark for "clothes horse".

See also
 List of bridges in France

References

External links 

 Website of Pont de Normandie and Pont de Tancarville 
 

Bridges completed in 1959
Buildings and structures in Seine-Maritime
Buildings and structures in Eure
Suspension bridges in France
Toll bridges in France
Bridges over the River Seine